Common Projects is an American luxury footwear company.

History
The company was founded in 2004 by Prathan Poopat, an American-based art director, and Flavio Girolami, an Italian creative consultant. The shoes are hand-stitched in Italy, and often use Italian Nappa leather.

The company name came about as Poopat and Girolami were working on a number of 'common' projects together, the original 'Achilles' shoe included, while living in separate countries. All of their shoes feature a line of numbers along the heel, displaying the style, the size and color, respectively. In the brand’s early years, these numbers could be rubbed off, but, now, they are branded in gold foil.

Awards and honors
Common Projects have been awarded  "Sneaker of the Week" twice by GQ magazine.

References

External links
 

Clothing companies established in 2004
Shoe designers
Shoe companies of the United States
High fashion brands
Shoe brands
Luxury brands